Serra do Alvão is a mountain range in Trás-os-Montes e Alto Douro, near Vila Real. It rises up to 1330m. The Alvão Natural Park is located inside the area of the mountain.

References

in Língua Portuguesa com Acordo Ortográfico [em linha]. Porto: Porto Editora, 2003-2015. [consult. 2015-12-31 22:52:07]. Available on Internet: http://www.infopedia.pt/$serra-do-alvao

Mountain ranges of Portugal